Gianluca Crisafi (born 11 November 1974) is an Italian voice actor. He contributes to voicing characters in anime, cartoons, movies, and other content.

Crisafi provides the voice of the character Kevin Levin in the Italian-language versions of Ben 10, Ben 10: Alien Force, and Ben 10: Ultimate Alien. He also provides the voice of the recurring character Irving in the Italian-language version of the Disney Channel animated series Phineas and Ferb.

Crisafi is married to voice actress Perla Liberatori.

Voice work

Anime and animation
 Kevin Levin in Ben 10
 Kevin Levin in Ben 10: Alien Force
 Kevin Levin in Ben 10: Ultimate Alien
 Andy in Winx Club
 Koga in InuYasha: The Final Act
 Irving in Phineas and Ferb
 Tsubasa Andō in Alice Academy
 Ezekiel in Total Drama Action
 Ezekiel in Total Drama World Tour
 Sigma in Battle B-Daman
 Percy Pea in VeggieTales
 Atchan in Hi Hi Puffy AmiYumi
 Marcos Gonzalez in Shuriken School
 Kevin in Ed, Edd n Eddy
 Kevin in Ed, Edd n Eddy's Big Picture Show
 and others
 Jin Kazama in Tekken: Blood Vengeance
 Artenborough Cortich in Gurren Lagann

Live action shows and movies
 Intelligence Officer Leon Broznic in Rush (2008 TV series)
 Boyce in Green Wing
 Ryan Church in Back to You
 Serge in Until Death
 Michael Novotny in Queer as Folk (2000 TV series)
 Davis in Accidentally on Purpose (TV series)
 Max Regnery in The Saddle Club
 Jeff McCann in Eyes (TV series)
 Dan Foster in State of Play (TV serial)
 Larry Summers in Blue Mountain State
 Tumelo in Life Is Wild
 and others

References

External links
 
 
 

1974 births
Living people
Italian male voice actors
Male actors from Rome